Marcel Mignot (born 11 June 1944) is a French former racing driver. Mignot along with Hervé Poulain and Manfred Winkelhock drove a BMW M1 Group 4 racing version that was painted by pop artist Andy Warhol for the 1979 24 Hours of Le Mans. They completed came in 6th overall and 2nd in their class.

References

External links
 

1944 births
Living people
French racing drivers
24 Hours of Le Mans drivers

BMW M drivers